Shaghalak (also Romanized as Shaghālak) is a village in Dust Mohammad Rural District, in the Central District of Hirmand County, Sistan and Baluchestan Province, Iran. At the 2006 census, its population was 491, in 114 families.

References 

Populated places in Hirmand County